General Electric Specialty Control Plant is a  historic factory complex located in Waynesboro, Virginia. The complex includes three contributing buildings, one contributing site (the original formal entry drive), and two contributing structures. The historic buildings and structures are a 340,000-square-foot main plant building (1953–1955, 1960), the original water tower, water tank, a group of evolved and interconnected construction sheds built from 1953 to the present, and an airplane hangar (c. 1927). The property, a former airport, was acquired by General Electric in 1953. The Waynesboro plant was one of some 120 individual operating departments created as part of a decentralization effort by the General Electric Corporation. The Specialty Control Plant was responsible for the development of breakthrough technologies in areas ranging from America's military efforts to space travel to computer technology. The facility was sold to GENICOM on October 21, 1983.

The property was originally on General Electric Drive. After the GENICOM sale, it was renamed GENICOM Drive. In 1994, GENICOM internally reorganized into two separate companies: Enterprising Solutions Services Company (ESSC) and Document Solutions Company (GENICOM). The road north of Hopeman Parkway was renamed Solutions Way while the southern part remained GENICOM Drive at the request of property owners in that area.

In 2000, GENICOM entered bankruptcy and the building was sold to the newly formed Solutions Way Management. The substantially downsized GENICOM operated as a tenant through its 2003 merger that formed TallyGenicom until a further bankruptcy and dissolution in 2009.

The building was added to the National Register of Historic Places in 2012.

Solutions Way Management rents much of the facility to companies for light manufacturing, warehousing and distribution.

Background 

In the early 1950s the General Electric Company was a highly centralized operation with six major manufacturing "works", as they were called. They were located in Schenectady, New York; Pittsfield, Massachusetts; Lynn, Massachusetts; Philadelphia, Pennsylvania, Erie, Pennsylvania; and Ft. Wayne, Indiana. At that time, under Ralph Cordiner's presidency, a major decentralization occurred whereby larger business groups were divided into individual operating departments, with new plants built in many different locations across the country.
  
The previous Industrial Control Division, located in Schenectady, New York,
was subdivided into four such departments, each of the first three
with a common product line sufficient for efficient and viable
operation as separate entities. The Industry Control Department,
building control systems for large industry such as cranes, steel,
paper, marine and submarine panels, and similar segments of industry,
was located in Salem, Virginia. The General Purpose Control Department,
building smaller control components such as relays and contractors for
general industrial applications, was located in Bloomington, Illinois. The
Appliance Control Department, building control systems for the
company's consumer products; i.e., refrigerators, oil burners, and
small switching devices, was located in Morrison, Illinois. The Specialty
Control Department came to Waynesboro, Virginia, bringing the remaining
heterogeneous components of the original Control Division, no one of
which could survive as a separate entity as could the first three.

Expansion

Construction 

In 1953, GE purchased the old, no longer used, Waynesboro airport,
consisting of 75 acres of land located just west of the Norfolk &Western Railroad and north of what was to become Hopeman Parkway—43 of them improved with the plant, parking lots, and finished
grounds. Construction of the new plant began, and by the summer of
1954 had reached a point where production of photoelectric devices
was begun with the relocation of supervisory personnel from
Schenectady, and the hiring of approximately 10 women from the local area.

Planning 

The original planning group that moved to Waynesboro from Schenectady
in 1954 included:
 
 Dr. L. T. Rader, General Manager
 Maggy Fitzgibbons, Secretary to Mr. Rader
 Ernie Hutton, Engineering
 Charles Hughes, Purchasing
 Cyril Lee, Planning
 Joe Ponzillo, Manufacturing
 Fred Curto, Buildings and Grounds
 Bill Walker, Laboratory
 
This group became the operating committee to oversee the subsequent
startup and transfer of personnel to Waynesboro.

1954 - Operations Begin 

In its first full year of operation, the new department hired 400
factory people, who, for the most part, had never had an industrial
job before. For many it was their first job ever.
  
Waynesboro and the surrounding area experienced a major building boom
in 1955 as over 140 GE families began relocating to work in the new
facility. The old apple orchard west of the city, principally the
Cortland Street area, rapidly filled with new homes. Similarly, Club
Court became another haven for new arrivals. Others filled many
vacant lots, not only in Waynesboro, but Augusta County as well. The
local families graciously welcomed the newcomers from the north, and
helped to facilitate a smooth transition and assimilation into their
new home. Over the next few years there were many new churches built
to accommodate an expanding membership, a new hospital was built to
replace a sorely out-moded facility on West Main Street, and shopping
in the area underwent a major overhaul.

Area employment 

Considering the years of operation and the peak employment of 3200
during the late 1970s when GE was rivaling Dupont as the largest
employer in the area, the total number of employees to pass through
the Waynesboro works may well match the entire population of the
city. Many came and found their life's career. Others moved on
through while seeking the end of their rainbow while still others,
growing weary of the structured working environment, returned to
their agrarian roots.

Infrastructure Renovations 

The original entrance to the new plant was a narrow lane across the
railroad at the north end of the property, and from US 340, the old
entrance to the airport. GE had insisted that a bridge be constructed
over the railroad to remove the safety hazard of many vehicles
crossing the railroad each day, and this was accomplished within two years.

Product variety 

The variety of products that was produced at the new location was as
extensive as it was varied. Such variety attests to the incredible
breadth and degree of technical and application expertise that
existed throughout the first 20 years. At least one person on the
staff was knowledgeable about practically every scientific phenomenon
except medicine and genetics. A partial list included:
  
 Hermetically sealed relays primarily for aerospace and military applications
 Numerical Control Systems for machine tools, with input from tracers, punched tape, punched cards, magnetic tape, and digital switches.  Ultimately, some were computer directed.
 Thy-Mo-Trol and Statotrol adjustable speed drives for the white print industry, winding/loop control, and many others where regulated, but adjustable, speed was required
 Regulators and static exciters for electrical power generation systems
 Photoelectric devices for a wide range of applications, including pinhole detectors, register controls, speed, and loop controls
 The marketing of selsyns (manufactured in Ft. Wayne) for remote indication and control
 Hot-box detectors for detecting over-heated bearings on railroad cars
 Aircraft and military products, (mostly at 400 Hz) including airborne protective panels, static exciters, regulators, military ground power supplies, regulators (navy) and amplidyne regulators, and, the power supply for the Lunar Excursion Module of the early moon probe.
 Machinery Automation systems that included weighing systems, test and inspection systems, and automated material control systems
 Width (thickness) gages for sheet steel using nuclear radiation.
  
This diversity had a positive effect as the department was in a
better position to weather the ups and downs of the normal business
cycles that occurred over the years, requiring fewer layoffs and
having a leveling effect on GE's and the local area's economic
stability, than that which occurred elsewhere. The Specialty Control Department was the only GE component that had turned a profit in the first year of its move.

1958 - State Resistance to Racial Integration 

In 1958, a major crisis occurred when Sen. Harry Byrd, who controlled
the politics in Virginia, launched a program of massive resistance to
the integration of blacks and whites, with the result that most
public schools in Virginia were closed. Because 10,000 children had
no means of public education, private schools began to be formed.
Specialty Control felt that this was an issue that should be
addressed, and after discussion with GE management most likely to be
affected, Specialty Control became the GE spokesman for the effort.
An association was formed in northern Virginia and Dr. Rader,
representing the GE plants in Virginia, joined the organization. He
gave many talks on the subject, mainly in northern Virginia, and his
main point was that if the State continued with this policy, no
Fortune 500 Company would locate in Virginia. It had a positive
effect on the issue. It may not have been just a rumor that Dr. Rader
threatened to remove the General Electric presence from Virginia.
Feelings ran very high on the subject of school closings.
  
The governor appointed a legislative committee to study the matter,
and they recommended that the State cease its resistance. The
recommendation was put to a vote in the Virginia Assembly and it
passed by one vote. This was the first time that the GE presence in
Virginia took an active part in the State's political activity.

1960: major expansion 

In 1960, a major expansion took place, adding both office and
manufacturing space plus a new auditorium and cafeteria to the
growing facility. It also included the addition of a "white room" for
the assembly of critical hermetically sealed relays.
  
The Waynesboro GE plant grew and prospered with many new
developments. Within the first decade of their arrival, existing
products expanded and by the late1960's a new product line known as
'Terminet' came into being. A special development team under Kirk
Snell, with John Larew, Seymour Depew and others, temporarily took
over a small facility (formerly an independent used car agency) in
Fishersville to develop the new product, utilizing solid-state
technology and printed circuit boards, thus offering a line of
printer terminals for the computer and business data field dominated
primarily by Teletype. Of the 25 or so employees in that group, only
one, Paul Morris, is still working in the local printer works. The
belt printer technology they developed was so viable that it was
shipped in printers for nearly 20 years.

Early 1970s: Division of the Specialty Control Department 

In the early 1970s, the original Specialty Control Department was
divided into two separate departments with the growing numerical
control group becoming the Numerical Equipment Control Department.
Joe Ponzillo and Warren Kindt headed these departments as General
Managers, respectively.
  
From the beginning of operations in Waynesboro, the Specialty
Control Department had five general managers: Dr. Louis T. Rader, who
later became Vice President of the Division. Dr. John Hutton
succeeded Dr. Rader, followed by Paul Ross. Joe Ponzillo and Warren
Kindt were each general managers of Specialty Control, having changed
positions after the formation of the Numerical Equipment Control Department.

1979 - Move from Waynesboro to Charlottesville

By 1979, GE-Waynesboro was bulging at the seams. This resulted in the
transfer of the Numerical Equipment Control Department into a new
facility north of Charlottesville, Virginia, where it became a part of the
Manufacturing Automation Systems Division and now partnered with
long-time competitor Fanuc.

Closure

Late 1960s 

By the late 1960s the aircraft business had already been transferred
to other GE plants located in Johnson City, New York, and Erie, Pennsylvania. By 1974,
the adjustable speed drives business had been transferred to GE's
plant in Erie, PA. The photoelectric business was absorbed by the
General Purpose Control Department in Bloomington, Illinois, and the power
systems components, consisting of static exciters and power
regulators, were transferred to the Industry Control Department in
Salem, VA. The residual products remaining in Specialty Control were
now reduced to the Terminet printers and the relay business. The name
Specialty Control now became Data Communications Products Department
and, at one time, Data Communications Products Business Department.

Late 1970s 

In the late 1970s, a major development was undertaken to design a
non-impact printing technology to compete with laser printers.
General Electric's Research and Development group in Schenectady, NY,
prepared the initial concepts. A temporary satellite group of
engineers continued the product development in the former Wilson
building (formerly Wilson Trucking Co.) on W. Main Street across New
Hope Road from the Purple Foot restaurant in Waynesboro. The new
printer was to become Terminet 8000, printing 8000 lines per minute.
At that time printers were operating at 300 to 600 lines per minute
and were producing 6 to 9 copies (plies). In order for this new
single-ply technology to compete, a speed at least ten times 600
lines per minute was adopted. The technology incorporated in it was
so far ahead of its time that Product Planning and Marketing were
unable to build a market for it --- and it died aborning.

Relays & High-Speed Impact Printers - The Creation of Genicom Corporation 

Of the many product lines that existed in Waynesboro, two confounded
the strategic planning of GE corporate management. For nearly 20
years it had predicted the perennial demise of the relay business.
Likewise, in the early 1980s, as the computer businesses had been
sold, it didn't see the long-term viability of high-speed impact
printers. At that time the darlings of the family became unwanted
children and their future was deemed uncertain, as they didn't fit
anywhere in the corporate business structure.

In 1981, GE made preparations to sell both the relay and the printer
businesses and the management-buyout was completed in October 1983. The announcement was made to the employees on October 21. GE
financed a small portion of the buyout price.
  
A new company was formed with the name Genicom Corporation. This new
venture included both relays and printers but the emphasis was to
exploit the market for the printer business under the direction of
Curtis Powell as CEO. Genicom ultimately sold the relay business to a
firm, CII Technology, a group of venture capitalists that were
combining all such manufacturers into one operation in North
Carolina.. The sale was made in the early 1990s.

The Growth & Evolution of Genicom Corporation 

Genicom was quite successful in its early operations, and its stock
went public in 1987–8. However, as the impact printer technology
began to be replaced by the laser print engine and the ink jet
technology, it became more and more difficult to compete as those
technologies were almost completely patented by others, and a license
was required to build them. Early on, Genicom realized that just
manufacturing and selling printers was not enough. It started a very
successful service business a.k.a. Enterprising Service Solutions
Company (ESSC) that eventually serviced all makes of printer and
printer-related products. A very large warehouse for this business
was built in Louisville, KY for this endeavor and much of the
Waynesboro service operation moved there. Also, there were many
country-specific corporations owned by Genicom across the globe. At
its zenith, Genicom had $400 million in sales.

The Bankruptcy Genicom Corporation 

Several attempts were made to buy/merge with others already in the
field (such as Centronics, Texas Instruments, and Digital EquipmentCorporation's printer division), but these efforts were ultimately
unsuccessful. On March 10, 2000, Genicom declared bankruptcy. On July
17, 2001, a group of venture capitalists, Sun Capital Corporation,
bought (for $9.3 million) the printer division of the bankrupt
company, and its name became Genicom LLC. It was then resold in 2003
and became fragmented.

Genicom LP 

A very narrow portion of the printer line continued to be built under
the name Genicom LP. Northrop-Grumman Information Technology took
over the parts and service of Genicom printers existing in the field
under the name Genicom, PLC, and it now operates as an on-line
Customer Service Center in a portion of the Waynesboro Outlet Village.

Talley-Genicom merger 

A merger of Tally and the residual Genicom was announced on
August 3, 2003 under the name Tally-Genicom and this new company,
with manufacturing at its Mexican affiliate or by manufacturing
partners, is continuing the design and manufacturing support of
dot-matrix and shuttle-matrix printers in a portion of the plant
formerly occupied by General Electric. Corporate headquarters still
resides at Chantilly, Virginia.

Solutions Way Management 

Solutions Way Management, LLC, a subsidiary of Allied Realty, Co., as part of the 2001 Genicom bankruptcy settlement, purchased the former GE property for $750,000 and now operates it as an incubator for fledgling new businesses, providing manufacturing space, and offering support services as required by the newcomers.

Pollution
General Electric and GENICOM manufactured circuit boards on site using a plating and etching processes that generated waste solvents. These solvents and other wastes contributed to groundwater contamination. General Electric assumed environmental responsibility for the contamination and operates a pump-and-treat system.

References

Industrial buildings and structures on the National Register of Historic Places in Virginia
Industrial buildings completed in 1955
Buildings and structures in Waynesboro, Virginia
National Register of Historic Places in Waynesboro, Virginia
General Electric
1955 establishments in Virginia